The 2015–16 Santa Clara Broncos women's basketball team will represent Santa Clara University in the 2015–16 college basketball season. The Broncos, led by second year head coach JR Payne. The Broncos were members of the West Coast Conference and play their home games at the Leavey Center. They finished the season 23–9, 13–5 in WCC play to finish in a tie for third place. They advanced to the semifinals of the WCC women's basketball tournament where they lost to BYU. They were invited to the Women's National Invitation Tournament where they lost to Fresno State in the first round.

On March 28, 2016, Payne has accepted the head coaching job a Colorado. She finished at Santa Clara with a 2 year record of 34–27.

Roster

Schedule and results

|-
!colspan=9 style="background:#AA003D; color:#F0E8C4;"| Exhibition

|-
!colspan=9 style="background:#AA003D; color:#F0E8C4;"| Non-conference regular season

|-
!colspan=9 style="background:#AA003D; color:#F0E8C4;"| WCC regular season

|-
!colspan=9 style="background:#AA003D;"| WCC Women's Tournament

|-
!colspan=9 style="background:#AA003D;"| WNIT

See also
 2015–16 Santa Clara Broncos men's basketball team

References

Santa Clara Broncos women's basketball seasons
Santa Clara
2016 Women's National Invitation Tournament participants